Alan Riche is an American film producer.

Filmography
He has produced the following movies:

Film

Thanks

He co-founded the production company Riche/Ludwig with producer Tony Ludwig. He is married to Wendy Riche.

References

External links 
 

American film producers